Purushan Pondatti is a 1996 Tamil-language comedy drama film directed by N. K. Viswanathan. The film stars Pandiarajan and Ranjitha. It was released on 6 December 1996. The film was a remake of Kannada film Ranjitha.

Plot

Pandian (Pandiarajan), a sale representative, gets married with Rajeswari (Ranjitha). Pandian's mother Vadivu (Vadivukkarasi) is a miser while his father Velmurugan (Manivannan) is a good man and they also have three daughters. Vadivu takes advantage of Rajeswari's salary and dowry. For the marriage of her first daughter Malini (Latha), Vadivu uses Rajeswari's jewels. Then, the groom (Thyagu) losses his job, so Pandian and Rajeswari decide to abortion for the benefit of the family. In the meantime, Malini becomes pregnant. Rajeswari, who was angry to be treated as a cash cow by Vadivu, resigns from her job. Vadivu, who expected a lot from her salary, gets then too upset and she tries to set Rajeswari on fire but Velmurugan saves her. Rajeswari then leaves Pandian's house and begins to find a job and have the opportunity to be independent some day. Despite the fact that she looks for a job everywhere, she could not find one. So she becomes a dressmaker and after that, she becomes a successful entrepreneur of a clothes factory. Meanwhile, Pandian's family are crippled with debts. What transpires later forms the crux of the story.

Cast

Soundtrack

The film score and the soundtrack were composed by Sirpy. The soundtrack, released in 1996, features 5 tracks with lyrics written by Vairamuthu and S. J. Surya.

References

1996 films
1990s Tamil-language films
Films directed by N. K. Vishwanathan
Indian comedy-drama films
Tamil remakes of Kannada films